The 1934–35 Rugby Football League season was the 40th season of rugby league football. A single league Championship was contested by twenty eight teams. The Challenge Cup was contested for the 35th time and the first European Championship took place between England, France and Wales.

Season summary

Swinton won their third Championship beating Warrington 14–3 in the play-off final after ending the regular season as the league leaders.

The Challenge Cup winners were Castleford who defeated Huddersfield 11–8 in the final.

London Highfield returned north and changed their name to Liverpool Stanley. 

Bradford Northern move into their new Odsal Stadium. The first match there on 1 September 1934 ended in a loss to Huddersfield.

Salford won the Lancashire League, and Leeds won the Yorkshire League. Salford beat Wigan 21–12 to win the Lancashire County Cup, and Leeds beat Wakefield Trinity 5–5 (replays: 2–2, 13–0) to win the Yorkshire County Cup.

Championship

Championship play-offs

Challenge Cup

Castleford beat Huddersfield 11–8 in the final at Wembley before a crowd of 39,000.  This was Castleford’s first Challenge Cup Final win in their first Final appearance.

This was Huddersfield’s first defeat in six Final’s appearances.

European Championship

The tri-nation tournament was played between January and April 1935 as single round robin games between England, France and Wales. This was the first Rugby League European Championship, won by England on Points Average.

Match Details

References

Sources
1934-35 Rugby Football League season at wigan.rlfans.com
The Challenge Cup at The Rugby Football League website

1934 in English rugby league
1935 in English rugby league
Northern Rugby Football League seasons